Pseudotalopia taiwanensis is a species of sea snail, a marine gastropod mollusk in the family Trochidae, the top snails.

Description

Distribution

References

 Helwerda R.A., Wesselingh F.P. & Williams S.T. (2014) On some Vetigastropoda (Mollusca, Gastropoda) from the Plio-Pleistocene of the Philippines with descriptions of three new species. Zootaxa 3755(2): 101–135

taiwanensis
Gastropods described in 2006